The Elgin Pillar is a class II Pictish stone, now situated on the north west side of Elgin Cathedral, in Elgin, Moray. It was discovered in 1823, lying 0.6m beneath the surface of the former churchyard of St Giles' Church, in Elgin High Street. It is thought to date from the 9th century, and suggests there may have been a centre of Early Christian activity in the marketplace area around the church in the centre of Elgin.

The stone is made of granite, and stands 2.08m high. It is 0.18m deep and its width tapers from 0.91m at its head to 0.80m at its base.

References

Pictish stones
Elgin, Moray